Arthur Loew Jr. (December 26, 1925 – November 10, 1995) was an American film producer.

Loew was born in New York City on December 26, 1925.  His maternal grandfather, Adolph Zukor, founded Paramount Pictures. His paternal grandfather, Marcus Loew, founded Metro-Goldwyn-Mayer Studios and Loew's Theaters, and his father, Arthur Loew Sr., was a president of M-G-M.

He produced such films as The Affairs of Dobie Gillis and Penelope starring Natalie Wood.  In the 1950s he was briefly married to Deborah Minardos Power, who had previously been the wife of actors Nico Minardos and Tyrone Power.  Loew died in 1995 in Amado, Arizona at age 69 of lung cancer.

Filmography
 Penelope (producer)
 The Rack (1956) (producer)
 The Marauders (1955) (producer)
 The Affairs of Dobie Gillis (1953) (producer)
 Arena (1953) (producer)
  Teresa (1951) (producer)

References

External links

1925 births
1995 deaths
Film producers from New York (state)
Businesspeople from New York City
20th-century American businesspeople
American people of Austrian-Jewish descent
American people of Hungarian-Jewish descent
Deaths from lung cancer
Deaths from cancer in Arizona